The Catalan Open was a European Tour golf tournament which was played annually from 1989 to 1996, except for 1990. It was played at several different golf courses in Catalonia, Spain. It never had the same full official name two years in a row, due to sponsorship and preferred language changes. The winners included future two-time Masters champion José María Olazábal. The prize fund was £200,000 in 1989 and £300,000 in all other years (plus the usual minor increments to the guaranteed amount for additional players who made the cut). By the final year this was the second smallest purse on the tour.

Winners

Notes

References

External links
Coverage on the European Tour's official site

Former European Tour events
Golf tournaments in Catalonia
1989 establishments in Catalonia
Defunct sports competitions in Spain